Bulgaria competed at the 2020 Summer Olympics in Tokyo. Originally scheduled to take place from 24 July to 9 August 2020, the Games were postponed to 23 July to 8 August 2021, due to the COVID-19 pandemic. Bulgarian athletes have appeared in every edition of the Summer Olympics since 1924, except for three occasions: the 1948 Summer Olympics in London, and the 1932 and 1984 Summer Olympics in Los Angeles because of Bulgaria's actions in World War II and the worldwide Great Depression and Soviet boycott, respectively.

Bulgaria won six medals, with three of them gold, its best result since 2004 in terms of total medals and since 2000 in terms of gold medals. This was the first time since 2008 that Bulgaria had won any gold medals. All 6 medals were won by female athletes.

Medalists

Competitors
The following is the list of number of competitors in the Games.

Athletics

Bulgarian athletes further achieved the entry standards, either by qualifying time or by world ranking, in the following track and field events (up to a maximum of 3 athletes in each event):

Track & road events

Field events

Badminton

Bulgaria entered three female badminton players for each of the following events into the Olympic tournament. Rio 2016 Olympian Linda Zechiri was selected among the top 39 individual shuttlers in the women's singles, while sisters Gabriela and Stefani Stoeva secured the women's doubles spot by finishing eighth in the BWF Race to Tokyo Rankings of 15 June 2021.

Boxing 

Bulgaria entered one male boxer into the Olympic tournament. Rio 2016 Olympian Daniel Asenov topped the list of eligible boxers from Europe in the men's flyweight division to secure his place on the Bulgarian team based on the IOC's Boxing Task Force Rankings. Stoyka Krasteva secured her spot by scoring a quarterfinal victory at the 2020 European Qualification Tournament in London, United Kingdom.

Canoeing

Sprint
With the cancellation of the 2021 Pan American Championships and the lack of eligible competitors available from the Americas in the canoe sprint regatta, Bulgaria accepted the invitation from the International Canoe Federation to send a canoeist in the inaugural women's C-1 200 m to the Games based on the results at the 2019 ICF Canoe Sprint World Championships in Szeged, Hungary.

Qualification Legend: FA = Qualify to final (medal); FB = Qualify to final B (non-medal)

Gymnastics

Artistic
Bulgaria entered one artistic gymnast into the Olympic competition. David Huddleston booked a spot in the men's individual all-around and apparatus events, by finishing tenth out of the twelve gymnasts eligible for qualification at the 2019 World Championships in Stuttgart, Germany.

Men

Rhythmic 
Bulgaria qualified a squad of rhythmic gymnasts for the group all-around by virtue of a top-three finish at the 2018 World Championships in Sofia. Two more rhythmic gymnasts were added to the roster by finishing in the top sixteen of the individual all-around at the 2019 World Championships in Baku, Azerbaijan. The athletes for the individual and group all-around were announced on 1 July 2021.

Judo
 
Bulgaria entered three judoka (two men and one women) into the Olympic tournament based on the International Judo Federation Olympics Individual Ranking.

Karate
 
Bulgaria entered one karateka into the inaugural Olympic tournament. Ivet Goranova qualified directly for the women's kumite 55 kg category by finishing top three at 2021 World Olympic Qualification Tournament in Paris, France.

Shooting

Bulgarian shooters achieved quota places for the following events by virtue of their best finishes at the 2018 ISSF World Championships, the 2019 ISSF World Cup series, European Championships or Games, and European Qualifying Tournament, as long as they obtained a minimum qualifying score (MQS) by May 31, 2020.

Swimming

Bulgarian swimmers further achieved qualifying standards in the following events (up to a maximum of 2 swimmers in each event at the Olympic Qualifying Time (OQT), and potentially 1 at the Olympic Selection Time (OST)):

Table tennis 

Bulgaria entered one athlete into the table tennis competition at the Games. Polina Trifonova booked the third of four women's singles spots with a third-stage final victory at the European Qualification Tournament in Odivelas, Portugal.

Weightlifting

Bulgarian weightlifters qualified for two quota places at the games, based on the Tokyo 2020 Rankings Qualification List of 11 June 2021.

Wrestling

Bulgaria qualified seven wrestlers for each of the following classes into the Olympic competition. One of them finished among the top six to book Olympic spots in the women's freestyle 62 kg at the 2019 World Championships, while four additional licenses were awarded to the Bulgarian wrestlers, who progressed to the top two finals of their respective weight categories at the 2021 European Olympic Qualification Tournament in Budapest, Hungary. Two Bulgarian wrestlers claimed one of the remaining slots each in the men's Greco-Roman 77 kg and women's freestyle 68 kg, respectively, to complete the nation's roster at the 2021 World Qualification Tournament in Sofia.

Freestyle

Greco-Roman

See also
 Bulgaria at the 2020 Summer Paralympics

References

Nations at the 2020 Summer Olympics
2020
2020 in Bulgarian sport